These hits topped the Dutch Top 40 in 2002 (see 2002 in music).

See also
2002 in music

2002 in the Netherlands
2002 record charts
2002